La Wallonie was a cultural review, founded by Albert Mockel, that was published in Liège by H. Vaillant-Carmanne from June 1886 to December 1892. It was significant in propagating Symbolism in French-speaking literary circles both in Belgium and more widely.

References

External links
 

1886 establishments in Belgium
1892 disestablishments in Belgium
Visual arts magazines
Monthly magazines published in Belgium
Defunct literary magazines published in Europe
Defunct magazines published in Belgium
French-language magazines
Magazines established in 1886
Magazines disestablished in 1892
Mass media in Liège